Austrostipa hemipogon is a tufted, perennial grass (a member of the family Poaceae. It is native to Australia, and found in Western Australia, South Australia, Victoria, and Tasmania. 

It was first described as Stipa hemipogon by George Bentham in 1878 from a specimen collected in Western Australia by James Drummond and in 1996 was transferred to the genus, Austrostipa, by Surrey Jacobs and Joy Everett.

References

hemipogon
Bunchgrasses of Australasia
Angiosperms of Western Australia
Flora of New South Wales
Flora of South Australia
Flora of Tasmania
Flora of Victoria (Australia)
Plants described in 1878
Taxa named by George Bentham